Pleural thickening is an increase in the bulkiness of one or both of the pulmonary pleurae.

Causes

Pleural plaques
Pleural plaques are patchy collections of hyalinized collagen in the parietal pleura. They have a holly leaf appearance on X-ray. They are indicators of asbestos exposure, and the most common asbestos-induced lesion. They usually appear after 20 years or more of exposure and never degenerate into mesothelioma. They appear as fibrous plaques on the parietal pleura, usually on both sides, and at the posterior and inferior part of the chest wall as well as the diaphragm.

See also
 Pleural disease

References 

Asbestos
Respiratory diseases